Sound Elixir is the fourteenth studio album by the Scottish hard rock band Nazareth, released in June 1983 by Vertigo Records.

Track listing

1999 Castle Music Bonus Tracks

2002 30th Anniversary Bonus Tracks

The 2011 remastered CD release of Sound Elixir was paired with 2XS, comprising tracks 12 through 21. No bonus material was added.

Personnel

Band members
Dan McCafferty - lead vocals
Manny Charlton - guitars
Billy Rankin - guitars, backing vocals, keyboards
Pete Agnew - bass, backing vocals
Darrell Sweet - drums, percussion

Other credits
Calum Malcolm - engineer, keyboards
Arthur Ward - art direction
Matthew Curtis - graphic design

Charts

References

Nazareth (band) albums
1983 albums
Vertigo Records albums
MCA Records albums